This is a list of women writers who were born in Bosnia and Herzegovina or whose writings are closely associated with that country.

A
Bisera Alikadić (born 1939), poet, novelist, children's writer

B
Nura Bazdulj-Hubijar (born 1951), novelist, poet, playwright, young adults writer

C
Umihana Čuvidina (c.1794–c.1870), early poet, songwriter

F
Zlata Filipović (born 1980), diarist, non-fiction writer, author of Zlata's Diary

K
Nasiha Kapidžić-Hadžić (1932–1995), children's writer, poet, textbook writer

M
Senka Marić (born 1972), poet and novelist
Ognjenka Milićević (1927–2008), biographer, essayist, translator

O
Ljubica Ostojić (1945–2021), poet, playwright, short story writer, critic, educator
Téa Obreht (born 1985), American-Bosniak novelist, author of The Tiger's Wife

S
Staka Skenderova (c.1830–1891), first woman author published in Bosnia
Tanja Stupar-Trifunović (born 1977), poet and novelist, winner of 2017 European Union Prize for Literature

See also
List of women writers

References

-
Bosnian and Herzegovinian women writers, List of
Women writers, List of Bosnian and Herzegovinian
Women writers, List of Bosnian and Herzegovinian